Lukoil Serbia (full name: Društvo za promet naftnih derivata Lukoil Srbija a.d.) is a Serbian petroleum company with headquarters in Belgrade, Serbia. Majority owned by Lukoil, the company's main activities include retail and wholesale trade of oil and oil derivatives in Serbia.

History

The company was established in the midst of breakup of Yugoslavia. On 7 December 1990, the unit of INA Trgovina in Serbia unilaterally formed a separate company and by 1991, it started to operate all INA properties in Serbia, including 200 petrol stations, nine warehouses, around a hundred trucks and 40 tank-trucks, and several vehicle maintenance shops. In May 1992, the company was renamed to Beopetrol.

On 26 September 2003, the Privatization Agency of the Government of Serbia sold Beopetrol to Lukoil. Lukoil paid €207 million for 79.5% of shares. Another company who participated on the privatization tender, was Hungarian MOL Group. After privatization the company was renamed Lukoil-Beopetrol.

As of 31 December 2016, Lukoil Serbia with 114 filling stations is the second largest petroleum company in Serbia in terms of market network.

References

External links
 

Companies based in Belgrade
Retail companies established in 1990
Energy companies established in 1990
Lukoil
Oil and gas companies of Serbia
Serbian companies established in 1990